David Benjamin Beard (15 September 1885 – 17 August 1965) was an Australian rules footballer who played with Geelong in the Victorian Football League (VFL).

Notes

External links 

1885 births
1965 deaths
Australian rules footballers from Victoria (Australia)
Geelong Football Club players
East Geelong Football Club players
Australian military personnel of World War I